Under Siege is a 1992 action film starring Steven Seagal.

Under Siege may also refer to:
Under Siege, a 1986 made-for-TV film co-written by Bob Woodward
Under Siege (US), / Hostages (UK) / Traficantes de pánico, a 1980 film directed by René Cardona Jr.
Under Siege (2005 video game), a 2005 action/first-person shooter video game for the PC (unrelated to the 1992 film)
Under Siege (2011 video game), a 2011 real-time tactics video game for the PlayStation 3 (unrelated to the 1992 film)
Under Siege 2: Dark Territory, the 1995 sequel to the Steven Seagal film Under Siege
"Under Siege (Regnum Irae)", Sepultura's third single
Under Siege (Live in Barcelona), a 1991 live home video by Brazilian thrash metal band Sepultura
Under Siege (novel), a 1990 novel by Stephen Coonts
 Impact Wrestling Under Siege, a 2021 professional wrestling event

See also 
 Siege (disambiguation)